

Wolfgang Fischer (11 December 1888 – 1 February 1943) was an officer in the Wehrmacht of Nazi Germany during World War II. He was killed on 1 February 1943 near Mareth in Tunisia when his staff car drove into a poorly marked Italian minefield and hit a land mine. He lost his left arm and both of his legs in the blast. He bled to death while writing a farewell letter to his wife.

Career
Fischer began his career by joining the 154th (5th Lower Silesian) Infantry Regiment with the rank of Fahnenjunker on 18 March 1910. 

When World War I broke out, he was transferred to the 7th Landwehr Infantry Regiment as a platoon leader. He was later named adjutant of the 3rd Landwehr Division in late 1915 and held the same rank in the 22nd Landwehr Infantry Brigade in the fall of 1917, serving in the Western Front. He became a captain at the end of the war and joined a battalion of volunteers during the German Revolution of 1918–19.

He joined the Reichswehr in 1919 and was sent to the 3rd (Prussian) Infantry Regiment at Deutsch Eylau (now Iława, Poland) from 1920 to 1929. Between 1929 and 1934, he was a company commander in the 6th Infantry Regiment at Lübeck. He assumed command of the 69th Infantry Regiment on 4 February 1938 during the  1938 Blomberg–Fritsch purge.

As an Oberst in 1939, he commanded the 69th Infantry Regiment from 1938 to 1939 and the 10th Rifle Brigade of the 10th Panzer Division from late 1939–41. He was promoted to Generalmajor on 1 August 1942 a day before he took command of the 10th Panzer Division and to Generalleutnant on 1 November 1942.

He was posthumously promoted to the rank of General.

Awards

 Clasp to the Iron Cross 2nd Class (4 September 1939) & 1st Class (17 September 1939)
 German Cross in Gold on 22 April 1942 as Generalmajor and commander of the 10. Panzer-Division
 Knight's Cross of the Iron Cross with Oak Leaves
 Knight's Cross on 3 June 1940 as Oberst and commander of the 10. Schützen-Brigade
 Oak Leaves on 9 December 1942 as Generalleutnant and commander of the 10. Panzer-Division

References

Citations

Bibliography

 
 
 

1888 births
1943 deaths
People from Nowa Sól County
People from the Province of Silesia
German Army personnel of World War I
Prussian Army personnel
German Army personnel killed in World War II
Generals of Panzer Troops
Recipients of the clasp to the Iron Cross, 1st class
Recipients of the Gold German Cross
Recipients of the Knight's Cross of the Iron Cross with Oak Leaves
Reichswehr personnel
20th-century Freikorps personnel
Landmine victims
Friendly fire incidents of World War II
Military personnel killed by friendly fire